Dead Kennedys: DMPO's On Broadway is a concert video by the American punk rock band Dead Kennedys, documenting their entire June 16, 1984 performance as the headlining act on the closing night of the On Broadway, a former avant-garde theatre and nightclub located in the 435 Broadway building, which it shared with the Mabuhay Gardens nightclub, in the North Beach area of San Francisco.

The 58-minute show was captured in real time, using four color cameras and a stereo hi-fi track.

Originally released in VHS format in 1985 as Dead Kennedys: Live in San Francisco, it would be re-released on DVD in 2000, under its current title.

Track listing
"Police Truck"
"Hop with the Jet Set"
"A Child and His Lawnmower"
"Religious Vomit"
"Do the Slag"
"Moral Majority"
"M.T.V. − Get off the Air"
"Life Sentence"
"Jock-O-Rama"
"Goons of Hazzard"
"Riot"
"Bleed for Me"
"Nazi Punks Fuck Off!"
"We've Got a Bigger Problem Now"

Notes

References

External links
 

Dead Kennedys albums
2004 video albums
Live video albums
2004 live albums